Stanisław Feliks Olejniczak (28 March 1938 – 1 February 2022) was a Polish basketball player. He competed in the men's tournament at the 1964 Summer Olympics.

He died on 1 February 2022, at the age of 83.

References

External links
 

1938 births
2022 deaths
Polish men's basketball players
Olympic basketball players of Poland
Basketball players at the 1964 Summer Olympics
People from Zbąszyń
Sportspeople from Greater Poland Voivodeship
Lech Poznań (basketball) players